Leafbuyer Technologies, Inc. (Leafbuyer) is a marketing technology company for the cannabis industry and is an online cannabis resource. The primary function of the company's website is to serve as a coupon directory for cannabis patients and recreational users.

Headquartered in Greenwood Village, Colorado, Leafbuyer is a publicly traded company serving the legal cannabis industry.

Background 
Leafbuyer was conceptualized in November 2012, after the passing of Colorado Amendment 64, which legalized the medical and recreational use of cannabis in the state. Notable developments since that time include partnerships with The Cannabist (owned by the Denver Post) in August 2016, Westword in December 2016, and Voice Media Group (owner of LA Weekly, Phoenix New Times, and Toke of the Town) in September 2017. In Q2 of 2017, the company became publicly traded on the OTCQB marketplace under the ticker LBUY. In June 2019, Leafbuyer opened a satellite office in Los Angeles.

Business Model 
Leafbuyer offers customer loyalty and retention platforms, display advertising, and listing packages to cannabis companies, including product companies, dispensaries, head shops, and grow stores. Primary services include listings on Leafbuyer.com and direct outreach to consumers through email and texting.

References 

Cannabis companies of the United States
American review websites